Schulte Hills is a small group of low hills lying 5 nautical miles (9 km) south-southwest of Stewart Heights in the Southern Cross Mountains, Victoria Land. Named by the southern party of New Zealand Geological Survey Antarctic Expedition (NZGSAE), 1966–67, for Frank Schulte, geologist with this party.

Hills of Victoria Land
Borchgrevink Coast